Brockmore Classic Replicas Limited was a British automotive manufacturer.

Company history 

The company from Brierley Hill, West Midlands took a project for Grand Illusions Motor Company. The production of automobiles and kits began. Their brand name was Brockmore, after Brockmoor in Brierley Hill. Production ended in 1994. The company produced about four replicas.

Vehicles 

The company offered replicas of the Triumph TR 2 and TR 3 models. The chassis and suspension were re-designed. Many parts were from Ford. Various motors types of Rover V8 engines from Rover were used to power these cars.

References

Bibliography 
 George Nick Georgano (Chefredakteur): The Beaulieu Encyclopedia of the Automobile. Volume 1: A–F. Fitzroy Dearborn Publishers, Chicago 2001, S. 199.
 Hole, Steve. A-Z of Kit Cars: The Definitive Encyclopaedia of the UK's Kit-car Industry since 1949. Sparkford: Haynes, 2011.

External links 
 Allcarindex

Car manufacturers of the United Kingdom
Kit car manufacturers
1993 establishments in the United Kingdom
1994 disestablishments in the United Kingdom
Defunct motor vehicle manufacturers of England